Detention is the process whereby a state or private citizen lawfully holds a person by removing their freedom or liberty at that time. This can be due to (pending) criminal charges preferred against the individual pursuant to a prosecution or to protect a person or property. Being detained does not always result in being taken to a particular area (generally called a detention centre), either for interrogation or as punishment for a crime (see prison). An individual may be detained due a psychiatric disorder, potentially to treat this disorder involuntarily. They may also be detained for to prevent the spread of infectious diseases such as tuberculosis.

The term can also be used in reference to the holding of property for the same reasons. The process of detainment may or may not have been preceded or followed with an arrest.

Detainee is a term used by certain governments and their armed forces to refer to individuals held in custody, such as those it does not classify and treat as either prisoners of war or suspects in criminal cases.  It is used to refer to "any person captured or otherwise detained by an armed force." More generally, it means "someone held in custody." The prisoners in Guantánamo Bay are referred to as "detainees".

Article 9 of the Universal Declaration of Human Rights provides that "[n]o one shall be subjected to arbitrary arrest, detention or exile." In wars between nations, treatment of detainees is governed by the provisions of the Fourth Geneva Convention.

Definition
 
Any form of imprisonment where a person's freedom of liberty is removed can be classed as detention, although the term is often associated with persons who are being held without warrant or charge before any have been raised. Being detained for the purposes of a drugs search is tantamount to a temporary arrest, as it is not yet known whether charges can be brought against an individual, pending the outcome of the search. The term 'detained' often refers to the immediacy when someone has their liberty deprived, often before an arrest or pre-arrest procedure has yet been followed. For example, a shoplifter being pursued and restrained, but not yet informed they are under arrest or read their rights would be classed as 'detained'.

Detention of a suspect

The detention of suspects is the process of keeping a person who has been arrested in a police-cell, remand prison or other detention centre before trial or sentencing.

The length of detention of suspected terrorists, with the justification of taking an action that would aid counter-terrorism, varies according to country or situation, as well as the laws which regulate it.

The Terrorism Act 2006 in the United Kingdom lengthened the 14-day limit for detention without an arrest warrant or an indictment from the Terrorism Act 2000 to 28 days. A controversial Government proposal for an extension to 90 days was rejected by the House of Commons. English criminal law requires the detainer/arrestor to have reasonable grounds to suspect (reasonable suspicion) when detaining (or arresting) someone.

Indefinite detention 

Indefinite detention of an individual occurs frequently in wartime under the laws of war. This has been applied notably by the United States after the September 11 attacks. Before the Combatant Status Review Tribunals, created for reviewing the status of the Guantanamo detainees, the United States has argued that it is engaged in a legally recognizable armed conflict to which the laws of war apply, and that it therefore may hold captured al Qaeda and Taliban operatives throughout the duration of that conflict, without granting them a criminal trial.

The U.S. military regulates treatment of detainees in the manual Military Police: Enemy Prisoners of War, Retained Personnel, Civilian Internees and Other Detainees, last revised in 1997.

The term "unlawful combatant" came into public awareness during and after the War in Afghanistan (2001–present), as the U.S. detained members of the Taliban and al-Qaeda captured in that war, and determined them to be unlawful combatants.  This had generated considerable debate around the globe. The U.S. government refers to these captured enemy combatants as "detainees" because they did not qualify as prisoners of war under the definition found in the Geneva Conventions.

Under the Obama administration the term enemy combatants was also removed from the lexicon and further defined under the 2010 Defense Omnibus Bill:

Section 948b. Military commissions generally:  (a) Purpose-This chapter establishes procedures governing the use of military commissions to try alien unprivileged enemy belligerents for violations of the law of war and other offenses triable by military commission.

Detention by country

China

There are three types of detention in the People’s Republic of China: administrative detention (security detention), judicial detention (civil detention), and criminal detention (pre-trial detention).

Administrative detention (security detention)

Refers to the most severe sanctions for general violations of the "Public Security Administration Punishment Law of the People's Republic of China", which is a type of administrative punishment.  The maximum period of public security detention is 20 days, and release upon expiration.  Administrative detention shall be signed and approved by the administrative responsible person (ie, director) of the public security agency at the county level and above, and shall be executed in the administrative detention facility under the public security agency.  Those who are dissatisfied with the detention may initiate administrative reconsideration and administrative litigation.  According to the decision of the Standing Committee of the National People's Congress, the Chinese national security agency and People's Armed Police has also been granted the power to enforce administrative detention penalties.

"Breakfast is a steamed bun, pickles and polenta. The meal will start at 6:30; at noon there will be two steamed buns. The dishes include potato beef, potato chicken, and scrambled eggs with seasonal vegetables. Instead of three dishes, choose one of three and start at 10:30."  Li Yanhong was told by the man in the water splashing incident that the "straight man went up to the tree" the inside of the Chaoyang Detention Center.

Judicial detention 
One refers to activities that hinder litigation in the course of civil, administrative litigation or court enforcement, such as perjurying, attacking the court, obstructing the testimony of witnesses, concealing and transferring sealed or seized property, obstructing court staff from performing their official duties, evading execution, etc.  The detention decision directly made by the people’s court is a judicial compulsory measure, based on the Civil Procedure Law or the Administrative Procedure Law. The maximum period is 20 days, and the court will deliver the detainee to the administrative detention facility of the public security department for execute.  Those who are dissatisfied can apply to the court for reconsideration. During the period of detention, the court shall decide to explain in advance or release at the expiration of the term.
There is also another type of judicial detention: Article 134 of the General Principles of the Civil Law stipulates: People's courts, in hearing civil cases, may be reprimanded, ordered to repent, and confiscated property and illegal gains for serious violations of civil laws and regulations and can be fined and detained in accordance with the law.  It can be seen that the detention stipulated in the General Principles of the Civil Law is a punishment method used by the people's courts to impose short-term restrictions on the personal freedom of persons who seriously violate the civil laws and regulations in the name of the country.  It is the most severe punishment in civil sanctions.

Article 38 of the National Compensation Law and Article 4 of the Interpretation of the Supreme People's Court on Several Issues Concerning Judicial Compensation in Civil and Administrative Litigations clearly stipulate the principle of the state's liability for civil execution compensation.

Criminal detention 

Refers to the criminal compulsory measures taken by public security agency, national security agency, or the People’s Procuratorate’s Anti-Corruption Bureau or the Malfeasance Investigation Bureau in accordance with the provisions of the Criminal Procedure Law against current criminals or major suspects during criminal investigations.  The criminal detention of the public security agency shall be approved by the person in charge of the administration of the public security agency at the county level (ie, the director).  Article 69 of the Criminal Procedure Law stipulates that if the public security organ considers a detained person to be arrested, it shall, within 3 days after detention, submit it to the investigation and supervision department of the People's Procuratorate for review and approval.  Under special circumstances, the time for requesting review and approval can be extended by 1 to 4 days.  For major suspects who commit crimes on the verge of committing crimes, committing multiple crimes, or ganging up to commit crimes, the time for review and approval can be extended to 30 days.  The People's Procuratorate shall make a decision to approve the arrest or not to approve the arrest within seven days after receiving the public security agency’s request to approve the arrest.  If the People’s Procuratorate does not approve the arrest, the public security agency shall release it immediately after receiving the notice, and promptly notify the People’s Procuratorate of the execution.  Those who need to continue the investigation and meet the conditions for release on bail pending trial or residential surveillance shall be released on bail pending trial or residential surveillance in accordance with the law.
Article 15 Item 1 of the original version of the "National Compensation Law of the People’s Republic of China", which was implemented from January 1, 1995, to December 31, 2012, stipulates that:  Detained by mistake", the detainee can apply for state compensation.
Article 17 Item 1 of the revised "National Compensation Law of the People's Republic of China", which came into effect on January 1, 2013, provides for the issue of state compensation for criminal detention.  Divided into two situations:
Taking criminal detention measures illegally
In the case of legally taking criminal detention measures but subsequently terminating the investigation of criminal responsibility, the victim must be detained beyond the detention period (up to 37 days) for the right to obtain compensation.

Netherlands 
Article 9, part 1a of Wetboek van Strafrecht states that there are 4 kinds of primary punishment. Two of them are two kinds of detentions, which are called gevangenisstraf and hechtenis, where the first is a heavier punishment than the second. The two other kinds of punishment is light community service and fines. Prisons are designed in several ways and there are 5 levels of regimes (which depends on the crime committed). Nieuw Vosseveld is a long stay prison with the heaviest regime for the most dangerous criminals.  The prison is meant for criminals that have been sentenced to 5 years of imprisonment and longer.

Turkey 
According to the Criminal Procedure Law, detention is restriction of one's freedom temporarily until either he stands trial in court or is set free to go. Contrary to arrest, which is ordered by juridical decision, detention is ordered by prosecution office. Public prosecutor can order detention only if the measure is a requisite for investigation and there is concrete evidence that one is suspicious of a crime.

See also 

 Arbitrary arrest and detention
 Civil liberties
 Defence Regulation 18B
 Detention of suspects
 Extrajudicial detention
 Grounding (discipline technique)
 Human rights
 Illegal combatant
 Immigration detention
 Legal awareness
 Older prisoners
 Prison reform
 Quasi-criminal
 Remand
 Restorative justice
 Security certificate
 Summary jurisdiction

References

External links
 
 Human Rights Watch on Detainees
 ACLU on Detainees
 Penitentiaire Inrichtingen in Vught
 Dienst Justitiële Inrichtingen